Igor Mostarlić  (born 31 May 1983) is a Croatian retired football player. He is now Sports director of the Gorica futsal team.

Club career
As a youngster, he joined Italian side Pisa from the Dinamo Zagreb academy aged 17, only to have his contract terminated after he broke his leg in a tournament between the lower league players in his hometown Velika Gorica. Mostarlić later played for Pula 1856, Međimurje and Osijek in the Croatian Prva HNL. He also had spells in Slovenia, Israel and Bosnia and Herzegovina, where he signed for Sloboda Tuzla in January 2010.

References

External links
 Statistics at Sportnet.hr 
 Profile & Statistics at One.co.il 
 

1983 births
Living people
People from Velika Gorica
Association football forwards
Croatian footballers
Croatia youth international footballers
NK Maribor players
NK Bela Krajina players
NK Istra 1961 players
NK Međimurje players
NK Osijek players
Maccabi Herzliya F.C. players
HŠK Posušje players
NK Jedinstvo Bihać players
FK Sloboda Tuzla players
NK Krško players
HNK Gorica players
Slovenian PrvaLiga players
Croatian Football League players
Israeli Premier League players
Premier League of Bosnia and Herzegovina players
Croatian expatriate footballers
Expatriate footballers in Slovenia
Croatian expatriate sportspeople in Slovenia
Expatriate footballers in Israel
Croatian expatriate sportspeople in Israel
Expatriate footballers in Bosnia and Herzegovina
Croatian expatriate sportspeople in Bosnia and Herzegovina